The 2018 term of the Supreme Court of the United States began October 1, 2018, and concluded October 6, 2019. The table below illustrates which opinion was filed by each justice in each case and which justices joined each opinion.

Table key

2018 term opinions

2018 term membership and statistics
This was the fourteenth term of Chief Justice Roberts's tenure and the first term for Justice Kavanaugh. The Court began its term with a vacant seat following the retirement of Justice Anthony Kennedy on July 31, 2018. The seat was filled by Brett Kavanaugh on October 6, 2018.

Notes

References

 
 

Lists of United States Supreme Court opinions by term